Indian Summer (Bablje ljeto) is a 1970 Croatian film directed by Nikola Tanhofer.

External links
 

1970 films
Croatian drama films
1970s Croatian-language films
Yugoslav drama films